

Academics
PEC awards Bachelor of Engineering in several fields of engineering M.E.Power Electronics & Drive, MCA and MBA.

65% of the students are admitted through Anna University single window counseling and the rest are through entrance exams (PEEE).

Technical symposia
All departments are conducting national level Technical symposia every year.
The names of symposiums are:
•	Techfest
•	PECHSCIMAT

References

External links
 Paavai College of Engineering Website 

Engineering colleges in Tamil Nadu
Colleges affiliated to Anna University
Education in Namakkal district
Educational institutions established in 2007
2007 establishments in Tamil Nadu
Namakkal